Cisoid may refer to:

 Geometric isomerism, form of geometric isomer
 Complex sinusoidal function, or complex exponential

A cisoid is the addition of two sinusoidal waves.